Down to My Last Bad Habit is the fourteenth studio album by American country music singer Vince Gill. The album was released on February 12, 2016, by MCA Nashville.

Critical reception

Down to My Last Bad Habit received generally positive reviews from music critics. At Metacritic, which assigns a normalized rating out of 100 to reviews from mainstream critics, the album received an average score of 80 based on 5 reviews, which indicates "generally favorable reviews".

Commercial performance
The album debuted at No. 4 on the Top Country Albums chart, with 17,000 copies sold in its first week. It is his 15th top 10 entry on the chart.  It sold a further 7,500 copies in its second week.  The album has sold 81,600 copies in the US as of March 2017.

Track listing

Personnel 
 Vince Gill – vocals, acoustic guitar, electric guitar, mandolin
 Tony Harrell – acoustic piano, Wurlitzer electric piano Hammond B3 organ, accordion
 Charlie Judge – keyboards, synthesizers, Hammond B3 organ 
 Pete Wasner – Wurlitzer electric piano 
 Reese Wynans – Hammond B3 organ 
 Richard Bennett – acoustic guitar 
 Tom Bukovac – acoustic guitar, electric guitar 
 Dann Huff – electric guitar 
 Dean Parks – electric guitar 
 Paul Franklin – pedal steel guitar
 Michael Rhodes – bass
 Willie Weeks – bass
 Fred Eltringham – drums, percussion
 Steve Jordan – drums, percussion
 Eric Darken – percussion
 Kirk "Jelly Roll" Johnson – harmonica
 Chris Botti – trumpet (8)
 Bekka Bramlett – backing vocals 
 Corrina Gill – backing vocals 
 Ellie Holcomb – backing vocals
 Kim Keyes – backing vocals
 Alison Krauss – backing vocals
 Jenny Van Valkenburg – backing vocals
 Charlie Worsham – backing vocals
 Karen Fairchild – backing vocals (9)
 Kimberly Schlapman – backing vocals (9)
 Phillip Sweet – backing vocals (9)
 Jimi Westbrook – backing vocals (9)
 Camaron Ochs – backing vocals (10)

Charts

Weekly charts

Year-end charts

References

2016 albums
Vince Gill albums
MCA Records albums